Lieutenant General Sir David William Scott-Barrett KBE MC (16 December 1922 − 31 December 2003) was General Officer Commanding Scotland.

Military career
The son of Brigadier Hugh Scott-Barrett, Judge Advocate General of the Army of the Rhine, who was later ordained, David Scott-Barrett was educated at Westminster School and was commissioned into the Scots Guards in 1942. He served in World War II with the 3rd Tank Battalion in North West Europe. In April 1945 he distinguished himself near Lüneburg by holding his position against determined German tank and infantry counter-attacks and was awarded the Military Cross for his actions.

After the War he became a General Staff Officer at HQ Guards Division and in 1948 was appointed an equerry to the Duke of Gloucester. He served as a company commander with the 2nd Battalion of his Regiment during the Malayan Emergency. In 1961 he was made an instructor at the Staff College, Camberley and in 1965 he became a General Staff Officer with 4th Division. He was made Commander of 6th Infantry Brigade in 1967.

In 1971 Scott-Barrett was appointed General Officer Commanding Eastern District and in 1973 he became Commandant of the British Sector in Berlin. He was appointed General Officer Commanding Scotland and Governor of Edinburgh Castle in 1976; he retired in 1979.

In retirement he became a Director of Arbuthnot Securities.

He died on 31 December 2004 and is buried in the northern extension to Dean Cemetery on Queensferry Road in Edinburgh. The grave faces north on the northmost path.

Family
He married Marie Elise Morris in 1948; they had three sons. Following the death of his first wife he married Judith Rogerson Waring in 1992, who survived him.

References

 

|-
 

|-
 

1922 births
2003 deaths
Military personnel from Cologne
Scots Guards officers
British Army lieutenant generals
20th-century British businesspeople
Knights Commander of the Order of the British Empire
Recipients of the Military Cross
Place of death missing
British Army personnel of the Malayan Emergency
British Army personnel of World War II
British expatriates in Germany
Burials at the Dean Cemetery
Academics of the Staff College, Camberley